Forkland may refer to:
Forkland, Alabama, a town in Greene County, Alabama
Forkland, Kentucky, a community in Boyle County, Kentucky
Forkland, Virginia, a community in Nottoway County, Virginia